"I Need Love" is a song by LL Cool J.

I Need Love may also refer to:

"I Need Love", single by Rhinoceros (band)
"I Need Love", by Deep Purple from Come Taste the Band
"I Need Love", by Golden Earring from Contraband
"I Need Love", by Laura Pausini from From the Inside
"I Need Love", by 'N Sync from *NSYNC
"I Need Love", by Olivia Newton-John from Back to Basics: The Essential Collection 1971–1992
"I Need Love", by Robin Thicke from The Evolution of Robin Thicke
"I Need Love", by Sam Phillips from Martinis and Bikinis
"I Need Love", by Sandra from Close to Seven